Chauth Ka Barwara Panchayat Samiti is one of the 7 Panchayat Samiti in the district of Sawai Madhopur in Rajasthan.

Panchayat Samiti Sadasy

Gram Panchayat segments

References

Panchayati raj (India)